Regiment Springs was an infantry battalion of the South African Army. As a reserve force unit, it had a status roughly equivalent to that of a British Army Reserve or United States Army National Guard unit.

History

Origin
Regiment Springs was formed in March 1972 and descended from Regiment Oos Rand as its 2nd Battalion, which in turn was raised in January 1964 in Benoni. 
The regiment was relocated to Springs and took its current name in March 1972.

Operations
Regiment Springs saw service on Internal Security duties and border duty.

Disbandment
The Regiment was disbanded in 1996.

Battle honours

Freedom of the City

Leadership

Regimental emblems

Dress Insignia

Roll of Honour

References

Infantry regiments of South Africa
Military units and formations of South Africa in the Border War
Military units and formations established in 1972
South African Army